Xuanhe is a town under the administration of Shapotou District, Zhongwei, Ningxia, China. , it administers the following 24 villages:
Xuanhe Village
Futang Village
Fuxing Village
Lingyang Village
Dongyue Village
Heying Village
Jiuying Village
Zhaotan Village
Sanying Village
Zhanghong Village
Hong'ai Village
Matan Village
Wangyuan Village
Yonghe Village
Caoshan Village
Jingnong Village
Xigou Village
Danyang Village
Caotai Village
Huahe Village
Haihe Village
Linghe Village
Xinghai Village
Linchang Village

References 

Township-level divisions of Ningxia
Zhongwei